Tessy María López Goerne (born October 22, 1961) is a Mexican solid-state chemist, professor, researcher, academic, and popular science communicator. She has specialized in the fields of nanotechnology and nanomedicine, as well as being a pioneer in catalytic nanomedicine.

Early life and education
López Goerne was born in Guanajuato City Mexico October 22, 1961. She graduated from the University of Guanajuato at the age of 17 where her father was a scientist. She obtained a Masters in Solid State physics and a PhD in Material Science from the Universidad Autónoma Metropolitana.

In 2005 she founded the research Lab in Nanotechnology & Medicine at the Autonomous Metropolitan University in Guanajuato Mexico. Her research focused on using nanoparticles to treat Epilepsy and Parkinson's.

Research and academics
López Goerne has worked as a researcher in the fields of molecular photodynamics, photocatalysts and bionanomaterials, materials and nanostructured reservoirs for controlled release of drugs. She was a research professor at Tulane University.

Nanogel
Lopez Goerne developed Nanogel, a gel with copper, titanium and silica nanoparticles while a researcher at Autonommous Metropolican University. She claims that the product can treat sores, surgical wounds, skin infections and other skin lesions. The proposed mechanism of action is that the nanoparticles enter and eliminate damaged cells. She started NanoTutt in order to manufacture and sell Nanogel.

Cofepris, the Mexican government agency tasked with overseeing pharmaceutical safety, concluded that the factory did not have proper sanitary permits to produce the product. In addition, the company Nanotutt does not appear to be certified to produce medical treatments. Nanututt has financial irregularities. Customers pay a "donation" to avoid taxes. The product was removed from Mercado Libre a Mexican online marketplace, although that is currently the only way to obtain the product.

Awards and distinctions
 Weizmann Award for the doctoral thesis "Proceso Sol-gel" (Weizmann Institute of Science and Mexican Academy of Sciences, 1991)
 Presea Marcos Moshinsky National Youth Science and Technology Award, awarded in Mexico by the Secretariat of Public Education (1991)
 National Award of the Mexican Academy of Sciences (1993)
 Manuel Noriega Morales Award in the area of Exact Sciences (Organization of American States, 1993)
 Javed Hussain UNESCO Award in Sciences (1995)
 Zazil-Avon Science and Culture Award (Avon Cosmetics, 1997)
 National System of Researchers Level III (Conacyt, 1998 to present)
 Founding president of the Sol-Gel Science and Technology Society (Mexico, 2002 to present)
 Consolidated Academic Body (September 2005 to present)
 Cámara Nacional de la Industria Farmacéutica Award (2006)
 Scopus Award (2009)
 Active Elsevier editorial board member

Published works
López Goerne has written more than 200 research articles in journals indexed under the ISI standard, as well as two research books.

Books
 Nanotecnología y nanomedicina: la ciencia del futuro...hoy. Arkhé Ediciones.
 Nanomedicina catalítica: ciencia y cáncer. Arkhé Ediciones.

Outreach works
 El mundo mágico del vidrio. Colección La Ciencia desde México. Fondo de Cultura Mexicana.
 Psst, psst, tú, ¿sabes qué son los cristales? Cuentos infantiles. (Sociedad Mexicana de Cristalografía, 2000)
 El amor en los tiempos de la contaminación Colección La Ciencia desde México (Fondo de Cultura Económica, 2004).
 El despertar de la epilepsia (Universidad Autónoma Metropolitana, 2006)

Educational material for children
 El estado sólido (audiovisual, 1984)
 La química, brujería... ¿o qué? (audiovisual, 1995)
 Cristalografía para niños (audiovisual, 1998)
 Taller de cristalografía para niños (1999)
  Psst—-psst—-tu. Sabes que son los cristales  (2000)
 Los tres estados de la materia (theater and audiovisual work, 2003)
 Taller interactivo para niños: El enigma del ingenioso artefacto llamado cerebro (2006)

References

1961 births
Living people
Metropolitan Autonomous University alumni
Academic staff of Universidad Autónoma Metropolitana
Mexican physical chemists
Mexican women academics
Nanotechnologists
People from Guanajuato City
Tulane University faculty
Mexican women chemists